The Web Index is a composite statistic designed and produced by the World Wide Web Foundation. It is the first multi-dimensional measure of the World Wide Web's contribution to development and human rights globally. It covers 86 countries as of 2014, the latest year for which the index has been compiled. It incorporates indicators that assess the areas of universal access, freedom and openness, relevant content, and empowerment, which indicate economic, social, and political effects of the Web.

Web Index scores

References

External links
 Official Website
 
 

Index
International rankings